The 2018 Patriot League men's soccer tournament, will be the 29th edition of the tournament. It determined the Patriot League's automatic berth into the 2018 NCAA Division I Men's Soccer Championship.

The Colgate Raiders are the two-time defending champions, and successfully defended their title defeating Army 1–0 in the final.

Background 
The 2017 tournament was won by Colgate Raiders, who qualified for the tournament on the last day of the regular season as the sixth and final seed in the tournament. Colgate were able to capture their seventh Patriot League Tournament championship, tying them with Lafayette. En route to the final, Colgate upset third-seed Bucknell and top seed Loyola. In the final, a 67th minute striker from Oliver Harris sealed the title for the Raiders against Holy Cross.

With the championship, Colgate earned an automatic berth into the 2017 NCAA Tournament. There they made a run to the Sweet Sixteen, upsetting No. 24 UMass and No. 13 Michigan along the way. Colgate ultimately fell to Louisville.

Seeds

Bracket

Results

Quarterfinals

Semifinals

Final

Statistics

Goals

All Tournament Team

References

External links 
 Patriot League Men's Soccer Tournament

Patriot League Men's Soccer Tournament